In molecular biology mir-202 microRNA is a short RNA molecule. MicroRNAs function to regulate the expression levels of other genes by several mechanisms.
The pre-miR-202 in the mouse genome is located fully within an exon, whereas in human it lies across a splice junction. This implies that human miR-202 is exposed to a negative regulation by splicing, whereas murine miR-202 is not.

See also 
 MicroRNA

References

Further reading

External links 
 

MicroRNA
MicroRNA precursor families